Robert Gerle (1 April 1924 – 29 October 2005) was an American classical violinist and music educator of Hungarian origin.

Life 
He studied at the Franz Liszt Academy of Music and at the Hungarian National Conservatory. As a Jew he came during the Second World War to a labour camp, from which he fled in 1945. Via Paris he came to Luxembourg, where he worked for a short time as a radio soloist. In 1950 he came to the US as a scholarship holder of the University of Illinois. In the 1960s he appeared as a violin soloist in the US and Europe and recorded works by Ludwig van Beethoven, Samuel Barber and others.

For his performance of all Beethoven sonatas for violin and piano with his wife, the pianist Marilyn Neeley, he received an Emmy Award for television in 1970. In the same year he married Neeley. Gerle taught violin at the Peabody Institute in Baltimore and at the Mannes School of Music in New York. From 1972 he taught at the University of Maryland, Baltimore County and at the Catholic University of America. He also conducted the Friday Morning Music Club and the Washington Sinfonia.

Gerle published the violin textbooks The Art of bowing practice (1983) and The Art of Bowing Practice (1991) as well as memoirs entitled Playing It by Heart: Wonderful Things Can Happen Any Day (2005).

Gere died in Hyattsville, Maryland, at age 81.

Further reading

References

External links 
 Concert Violinist Robert Gerle Dies, Washington Post, 31 October 2005
 Robert Gerle, concert violinist was a teacher and author; at 81, The Boston Globe, 4 November 2005
 Classical.net Violin Concerti Frederick Delius: Violin Concerto; Samuel Barber: Violin Concerto; Robert Gerle, violin; Vienna State Opera Orchestra/Robert Zeller
 Robert Gerle Papers in der Albin O. Kuhn Library & Gallery. University of Maryland, Baltimore County
 Foto Robert Gerle, Tournee Süd-Afrika, 1972
 

American classical violinists
20th-century American violinists
Male classical violinists
American music educators
Franz Liszt Academy of Music alumni
1924 births
2005 deaths
People from Opatija
20th-century American male musicians